Tau Puppis, Latinized from τ Puppis, is a star in the southern constellation of Puppis, near the southern constellation boundary with Carina. The variable radial velocity of this system was detected by H. D. Curtis and H. K. Palmer in 1908, based on observations made at the D. O. Mills Observatory. It is a spectroscopic binary star system, with the presence of the secondary component being revealed by the shifts of absorption lines in the spectrum resulting from the Doppler effect.

The primary component of this system has a stellar classification of K1 III. A luminosity class 'III' indicates this has expanded into a giant star after exhausting the supply of hydrogen at its core and evolving away from the main sequence of stars like the Sun. This gives a lower bound on the azimuthal velocity of rotation along the star's equator.

References

External links
 EAAS: Puppis

K-type giants
Spectroscopic binaries
Puppis
Puppis, Tau
Durchmusterung objects
050310
032768
2553